From Spirits and Ghosts (Score for a Dark Christmas) is the second classical and Christmas album, and the seventh studio album released by the Finnish soprano Tarja Turunen.

On the 22 September 2017, earMUSIC released a video announcing the existence of the album. A music video was released on the 6th of October, with Tarja singing "O Come, O Come, Emmanuel".

With the album release comes also Tarja Turunen's first graphic novel, From Spirits and Ghosts (Novel for a Dark Christmas). The 40-page novel is about the world of dark Christmas scripted by Peter Rogers with accompanying art by Conor Boyle. The "novel for a dark Christmas" revolves around Tarja's two characters, the dark and light one, bringing together lonely souls during the festive season.

The album has been critically acclaimed by critics and fans alike, who have noted the dark twist Turunen achieved on the album and the combination of different languages; however, critics have commented that the album will be largely forgotten after the Christmas holidays.

The album was re-released on November 6, 2020, the reissue includes 3 versions in alternative languages plus the collaboration with Tarja's friends Cristina Scabbia, Doro Pesch, Elize Ryd, Floor Jansen, Hansi Kürsch, Joe Lynn Turner, Marco Saaresto, Michael Monroe, Sharon den Adel, Simone Simons, Timo Kotipelto and Tony Kakko for the beloved "Feliz Navidad". Further to the additional studio recordings, the reissue comes with the previously unreleased live album "Christmas Together: Live at Olomouc and Hradec Králové 2019".

Background
The album includes 11 Christmas classics combined with darker gothic influences. Utilizing the sound of a grand orchestra, traditional songs such as "O Tannenbaum", "We Wish You a Merry Christmas" and "Feliz Navidad" are included. Besides covering classic carols, "From Spirits and Ghosts" also features a 12th track, the original track "Together". This song continues the dark sound of the album and embodies the theme of ghosts and mysticism throughout.

On December 8, Tarja released a second, "charity" version of "Feliz Navidad" as a way to help raise funds for Barbuda, an island that was severely damaged by Hurricane Irma. The track features guest vocals by Doro Pesch, Michael Monroe, Tony Kakko (Sonata Arctica), Elize Ryd (Amaranthe), Marko Saaresto (Poets of the Fall), Timo Kotipelto (Stratovarius), Simone Simons (Epica), Cristina Scabbia (Lacuna Coil), Joe Lynn Turner (Rainbow, Deep Purple), Floor Jansen (Nightwish), Hansi Kürsch (Blind Guardian) and Sharon Den Adel (Within Temptation).

Track listing

Musicians
 Tarja Turunen – vocals, keyboard & piano
 Naomi Eerika Alexia Cabuli Turunen – lead vocals on Deck the Halls
 Peter Gregson – cello
 Jim Dooley (James) – keyboard, piano, orchestral and choir arrangements

Charts

References

External links
 Tarja-fromspiritsandghosts Microsite
 Tarja Turunen Official Website

Tarja Turunen albums
2017 Christmas albums
Classical Christmas albums